, formally "Ikeda Chikugo no kami Nagaoki", was the governor of small villages of Ibara, Bitchū Province (Okayama Prefecture), Japan, during the end of the Tokugawa shogunate.

He was, at 27, the head of the Second Japanese Embassy to Europe (Japanese:第２回遣欧使節), also called the Ikeda Mission, sent in 1863-1864 by the Tokugawa shogunate to negotiate the cancellation of the open-port status of Yokohama. The mission was sent following the 1863 "Order to expel barbarians" (攘夷実行の勅命) issued by Emperor Kōmei, and the Bombardment of Shimonoseki incidents, in a wish to close again the country to Western influence, and return to sakoku status.

Nagaoki left with a mission of 36 men on a French warship, stopped in Shanghai, India and Cairo through the Suez canal. His mission visited the pyramids, a feat which Antonio Beato photographed at the time. He finally arrived in Marseille and then Paris, where he met with Napoleon III and with Philipp Franz von Siebold. He stayed at the Grand Hotel in Paris.

The request to close Japanese harbours to Westerners was doomed as Yokohama was the key springboard for Western activity in Japan. The mission was a total failure. Nagaoki however was very impressed with the advancement of French civilization, and became very active in promoting the dispatch of embassies and students abroad, once he had returned to Japan. He was finally put under house arrest by the Bakufu.

Nagaoki brought many documents from France, related especially to physics, biology, manufacture, textiles and also fermentation technologies. He is considered as one of the fathers of the wine industry in Japan.

The Last Samurai star Shin Koyamada, who's also from Okayama Prefecture same as Nagaoki, made his full feature documentary called Wine Road of the Samurai (2006), which was nationally broadcast by Japan News Network in Japan. Koyamada followed his footsteps traveling to France and Egypt where Nakagoki and 36 Samurai traveled to.

See also
Wine Road of the Samurai

External links
The samurai who dreamed of a wine-producing Japan
 https://web.archive.org/web/20090525090114/http://www.tk-ryoma.com/cgi/mt/archives/2007/10/post_230.html

1837 births
1879 deaths
Samurai
Members of the Second Japanese Embassy to Europe
People from Okayama Prefecture